Prairie View is an unincorporated community in Boone County, Illinois, United States. Prairie View is located along a railroad line west of Belvidere.

References

Unincorporated communities in Boone County, Illinois
Unincorporated communities in Illinois